Robert Péri (29 January 1941 – 15 January 2022) was a French professional footballer who played as a defender.

External links

Profile on French federation official site
Profile - FC Metz

1941 births
2022 deaths
French people of Corsican descent
French footballers
Footballers from Marseille
Association football defenders
France international footballers
Corsica international footballers
Ligue 1 players
Ligue 2 players
Pays d'Aix FC players
Stade Français (association football) players
FC Girondins de Bordeaux players
FC Metz players
Angoulême Charente FC players
SC Toulon players